Julian Deda (born 15 September 1981) is an Albanian comedian and actor. Born in Shkodër and son of famous Albanian actor Zef Deda, he is best known for his role on Albanian live television non-scripted sitcom Apartment 2XL.

Filmography

References

1981 births
Living people
Albanian male film actors
Albanian male television actors
Albanian male voice actors
People from Shkodër